Malcolm MacDonald (also known by the alias "Calum MacDonald") (26 February 1948 – 27 May 2014) was a British author, mainly about music.

Biography
MacDonald was born in Nairn, Scotland and educated at the Royal High School, Edinburgh and Downing College, Cambridge. He lived in England from 1971 until his death, first in London and from 1992 in Gloucestershire. He died at Leckhampton Hospice.

He wrote several books, notably volumes on Brahms, Schoenberg, John Foulds, Edgard Varèse, the Scottish composer-pianist Ronald Stevenson and a three-volume study of the 32 symphonies of Havergal Brian. Other books include a tourist guidebook to the city of Edinburgh and a multi-volume edition of the musical journalism of Havergal Brian. He contributed chapters to symposia on Brahms, Alan Bush, Erik Bergman, Shostakovich, Bernard Stevens, Ronald Stevenson, Varèse, an essay on Czesław Marek to a symposium on Swiss Composers, and another on Scottish composers to a symposium on musical nationalism in Great Britain and Finland. He also compiled catalogues of the works of John Foulds, Shostakovich, Luigi Dallapiccola and Antal Doráti and contributed articles to many musical encyclopaedias such as the New Grove. He was editor of the modern-music journal Tempo, which he joined in 1972 as assistant to the then editor David Drew, until December 2013, and was a copious contributor to other English-language music-journals and magazines. For these and other journalistic purposes he used the nom-de-plume Calum MacDonald because at the outset of his writing career, which began with record reviewing for the journal Records & Recording, confusion arose between him and the composer Malcolm MacDonald, who was a long-established record reviewer for The Gramophone. As Calum MacDonald he also reviewed regularly for BBC Music Magazine and International Record Review.

MacDonald was a prime mover in the revival of interest in the music of John Foulds. He has also composed a number of works, mainly piano pieces and songs. In 1996 he edited for performance, and orchestrated the final portions of, the ballet Soirées de Barcelone by Roberto Gerhard, which was broadcast that year, performed by the BBC Philharmonic Orchestra, in a concert to mark the fiftieth anniversary of the BBC Third Programme.

Writings (selected list)

Books
  (limited edition)
 
 
 
 
 
  No ISBN. 'Reprinted from Tempo 143 '
 
 
 
 
 
 
 
  Revised edition of the 1976 Master Musicians volume.

Articles in symposia
 'David Blake'; 'Postlude – a note on Christopher Shaw' in Lewis Foreman (ed), British Music Now: A Guide to the Work of Younger Composers (London,1975)
 'Three Works by Erik Bergman' in J. Parsons (ed), Erik Bergman, A Seventieth Birthday Tribute (Helsinki, 1981)
 'Words and Music in Late Shostakovich' in C. Norris (ed), Shostakovich: the Man and his Music (London, 1982)
 'Aspects of Scottish Musical Nationalism in the 20th Century, with special reference to the Music of F.G. Scott, Ronald Center and Ronald Stevenson' in T. Mäkelä (ed), Music and Nationalism in 20th-century Great Britain and Finland (Hamburg, 1997)
 '"Dear Crusoe ... Always your Freitag": the Brian letters at McMaster University'; 'Havergal Brian's Letter to Herbert Thompson: some implications'; ' The Gothic: music and meaning'; 'Brian as Faust'; 'Psalm 23 – early Brian or late?'; 'Let the Roar of the Tigers be heard in the Land', all in J. Schaarwächter (ed), HB: Aspects of Havergal Brian (Aldershot, 1997)
 'A Plaited Music: Ronald Stevenson at 70'  in 'Meeting Ronald Stevenson', symposium in Chapman 89–90 ed. Joy Hendry (Edinburgh, 1998) 
 'Czesław Marek and his Sinfonia''' in Walton & Baldassare (eds), Musik im exil: Die Schweiz und das Ausland 1918–1945 (Berne, 2005)
 'The Orchestral Music' in Colin Scott-Sutherland (ed), Ronald Stevenson: The Man and his Music, A Symposium (London, Toccata Press, 2005) 
 ' "I took a simple little theme and developed it": Shostakovich's string concertos and sonatas' in Pauline Fairclough and David Fanning (eds), The Cambridge Companion to Shostakovich (Cambridge, Cambridge University Press, 2008) 

Articles
 Many articles in the Newsletter of The Havergal Brian Society (see Articles in Symposia for those republished in 1997)
 'Havergal Brian' (The Listener, 15 July 1971)
 'Sense and Sound: Gerhard's Fourth Symphony' (Tempo No.100, 1972)
 'Ronald Stevenson' (Musical Events, 1972)
 'Visionary and Craftsman: Scriabin and Enescu' (The Listener, 8 September 1983)
 'Visionary Ecstasy: Szymanowski's Third Symphony' (The Listener, 15 September 1983)
 'Unreconciled Spirit: Franz Liszt 100 Years On' (The Listener, 24 July 1986)
 'Sombre Tragedy: Karl Amadeus Hartmann's Symphonies' (The Listener, 4 September 1986)
 'Spinner's Violin Sonata – Why Op.1?' (Tempo No.161/162, 1987)
 'Key Changes: Henze's Third Period?' (The Listener, 1 September 1988)
 'John Foulds (1880–1939). The Cello Sonata and its Context' (British Music Vol.20, 1998)
 'Statements and Connotations: Copland the Symphonist' (Tempo No.213, 2000)
 'Thoughts on Siegfried Wagner's Music' (International Record Review Volume 8 issue 10, July/August 2008)
 'Où l'on retrouve les ailes ...' (Tempo Vol. 64 No. 252, April 2010)

Sources
Mainly from the flyleaves of his books, and an autobiographical article, 'Too Many Records' in International Record Review'' (June 2002 edition)

References

1948 births
2014 deaths
Alumni of Downing College, Cambridge
British musicologists
People educated at the Royal High School, Edinburgh
Scottish music critics
Scottish biographers
Brahms scholars